Melanthium woodii, common names Wood's bunchflower or Ozark bunch-flower, is a species formerly known as Veratrum woodii. It is native to the central and southeastern parts of the United States, from Arkansas, Florida, Georgia, Illinois, Indiana, Iowa, Kentucky, Missouri, North Carolina, Ohio, Oklahoma and Tennessee. It can be found in forested areas at elevations less than 800 m (2700 feet).

Melanthium woodii is a perennial herb forming bulbs up to 1.6 cm (0.64 inches) and spreading by means of underground rhizomes.  Leaves are elliptic to oblanceolate, up to 50 cm long. Inflorescences can be up to 60 cm (2 feet) long. The flowers contain the most distinguishing features of the species, as no other species in the genus has chocolate brown tepals and tomentose young ovaries.

References

Melanthiaceae
Flora of the United States